Tatuus is an Italian chassis manufacturer for a series of formula racing series, being first founded in 1980. The company is known for its association with Renault Sport for its production of the Formula Renault chassis.

Corporate History
The company operated independently for 37 years, with Gianfranco De Bellis joining as a co-owner and still remains to this day president of the company. 

On 16 February 2017 De Bellis and Sandonà sold a majority of the shares to  Wisequity IV. Wisequity IV is a closed-ended fund managed by private equity firm Wise Sgr S.p.A. Wisequity IV has an investment value of €215,000,000. The private equity fund manages five companies, Tatuus Racing, Corob, Imprima Group, Tapì Group and Aleph Team. De Bellis and Sandonà kept a minority stake in the company.

Under the ownership of Wise Sgr Tatuus expanded its operations. In November 2017 Tatuus purchased racing engine producer Autotecnica Motori. Autotecnica Motori founder Giovanni Delfino retained his role as CEO of the company & also moved into a role in senior management at Tatuus, later becoming CEO of the whole group.  Another purchase was done in November 2018. Tatuus Racing SpA purchased a 75% stake in Breda Racing, a producer of autosport related equipment.

Racing History

The Tatuus company was founded by Artico Sandonà in 1980. The first cars were manufactured for the 500cc and 1000cc Formula Monza championship. Founder Sandona was one of the drivers in the Formula Monza championship. Luca Melgrati won the first championship for Tatuus in 1983 in the Formula Panda Monza championship. Sandona achieved a second place in the championship. Tatuus were the team and chassis to beat. Melgrati won the championship again in 1985 and 1986.  For the 1988 season the Italian manufacturer was contracted to build the cars for the new Formula König. The car was a tube framed, wings and slicks racecar. The first season was won by seven-time Formula 1 champion Michael Schumacher.

Formula 3 team
Although not a Formula 3 constructor, Tatuus entered the Italian Formula Three as a team in 1989. Driver Fabrizio Bettini took the rookie of the year title in their inaugural season. Bettini drove an Alfa Romeo powered Dallara 389 chassis and achieved two podium finishes in seven races. Niko Palhares represented Tatuus in their 1991 campaign. Palhares scored one pole position and one podium finish in the Italian championship. Tatuus entered the Monaco Grand Prix Formula Three support race for the first time. Palhares achieved a 16th place, he was the last running driver. Their 1992 campaign ended in a second place in the championship for Brazilian driver Niko Palhares. Palhares had less luck in the annual Monaco F3 Grand Prix, he failed to finish. Tatuus made their first appearance in the Masters of Formula 3. Palhares finished in 14th place during the second edition of this Formula 3 classic. The following year Fiat appointed Tatuus as their official factory team. The team had little success in the Italian championship (Gianantonio Pacchioni finishing seventh). But Pacchioni achieved a win at the prestigious Monaco F3 Grand Prix. At the Masters of Formula 3 at Circuit Park Zandvoort local Formula Ford 1600 driver Tom Coronel joined the team. Pacchioni scored a seventh-place finish while Coronel finished in 20th place. The team improved for the following season. The team fielded Pacchioni, who was considered one of the favorites, and rookie Simone Rebai. Pacchioni didn't take the title but managed to finish third in the standings. For the Masters of Formula 3 Rebai was replaced by Roberto Colciago. Coming over from RC Motorsport Colciago managed to beat regular driver Pachioni by placing seventh compared to Pachioni's 25th place. After winning the Formula Alfa Boxer championship in a Tatuus chassis Tony Kanaan joined the Tatuus Formula 3 team. Kanaan scored one win and was the best foreign driver in the Italian championship finishing fifth in the final standings. After this season, Tatuus focused on Formula Renault.

Formula Renault era
In 1993 Gianfranco De Bellis became co-proprietor. Tatuus then-on focused on producing Formula Renault cars. The Tatuus RC95 was the first Formula Renault car made by Tatuus. The Tatuus factory team fielded three drivers, Italian Rino Mastronardi, Norwegian Tommy Rustad and Brazilian Enrique Bernoldi. The team competed in the Eurocup Formula Renault, Tommy Rustad won three races during the inaugural season for the team. The first title for the Tatuus factory team and chassis came in 1996. Enrique Bernoldi won six out of ten races and took the title. Teammate Danilo Cascio was places seventh. David Cook entered a Tatuus customer car in the British Formula Renault championship. In this very competitive championship Cook beat Darren Turner to the 1996 title. Other customer Tatuus chassis were entered in the French Formula Renault, Antoine Brousseau achieved a second place in the championship. A Tatuus chassis also took the title in the German Formula Renault with driver Alexander Müller. 1997 was a highly successful for the team and the chassis. The team scored a one-two finish in the European championship. Jeffrey van Hooydonk and Max Busnelli were a class on their own securing the first and second place in the championship. The top ten were seven Tatuus and three Martini cars. Three Tatuus customer entries filled the podium in the German championship. Robert Lechner won the title in front of Thomas Mutsch and Michael Schröter. Marc Hynes, driving a customer Tatuus, won the British title. The French championship, however, was a different story. France, home of Mygale, Martini and Renault, had the most competitive Formula Renault championship. Benoît Tréluyer driving a Tatuus was placed sixth in the championship standings, scoring one win and four podium finishes out of 17 races. Tatuus again was the chassis to beat in the European, British and German championships. Lucas Lasserre managed to achieve a third place in the French championship, behind two factory entered Mygales. Tatuus again dominated the British championship in 1999 with Tatuus chassis winning 12 out of 13 races, Antônio Pizzonia took the title. Tatuus customer entries also won the European and German championships. Lucas Lasserre now took the title in the prestigious French championship. In heavy competition between Mygale, Martini and Tatuus, Tatuus prevailed winning 14 out of 21 races.

USF2000
For the 1997 racing season Tatuus made its debut in the USF2000, fielding a factory team. Rino Mastronardi won the second race of the season in the streets of St. Petersburg. Starting third, Mastronardi managed to finish in front of Matt Sielsky and Buddy Rice. This, however, was the only outing of Mastronardi.  The rest of the season the team fielded Steven Rikert and Giuliano Losacco. Tatuus finished second in the manufacturer standings scoring 40 points, behind Van Diemen who scored 93 points. For the following season Tatuus supplied other teams with race cars as well as running the factory team. Factory driver Ryan Hampton finished second in the standings. Robby McGehee was the best placed customer Tatuus, fielded by RM Racing finished he third in the season standings. For the 1999 season Tatuus didn't field a factory team. Although some teams chose to run a Tatuus chassis, among them A. J. Foyt Enterprises fielding Larry Foyt. There were no full-time Tatuus entries, thus Tatuus could not compete for the title. Various Tatuus RC98 chassis are still being raced in the SCCA Formula Continental class. The car achieved various successes in the club racing scene. The cars were also entered in SCCA's most prestigious races the SCCA National Championship Runoffs and the June Sprints.

Tatuus was selected by the series promoter as the new spec chassis for the U.S. F2000 National Championship beginning in 2017. A derivative of the same chassis but with more power, downforce, and adjustments will be the spec chassis for the Pro Mazda Championship beginning in 2018.

Formula Ford Zetec
In 1998 Tatuus entered the Formula Ford Zetec market. In 1999 the chassis achieved success with German driver Timo Bernhard driving for Jenzer Motorsport. The German driver achieved four podium finishes and a third place in the German Formula Ford championship. After 1999 Tatuus did not update their Formula Ford Zetec chassis. In the current French Formula Ford Zetec championship, the Tatuus chassis achieved various wins and championships.

Formula Renault

Tatuus was contracted to design and manufacture the new spec Formula Renault cars. The Tatuus FR2000 debuted in 2000 in various Formula Renault championships. This racecar was used until 2010 when it was replaced by Barazi-Epsilon. In 2002 the Tatuus FR1600 was introduced to run in the Formula Renault 1.6. With the introduction of the spec formula classes the racing team ceased to exist. For the 2003 Formula Renault V6 Eurocup season the Tatuus FRV6 was introduced. After the European championship folded, the car was raced in the Formula V6 Asia between 2006 and 2009.

Toyota Racing Series
Tatuus was contracted by Toyota New Zealand to design the new Formula Toyota racing car. The Toyota FT40 was introduced in the Toyota Racing Series in 2005. After ten seasons the car was retired at the end of the 2014 Toyota Racing Series season. The cars last race, the New Zealand Grand Prix, was won by Nick Cassidy. For the 2015 Toyota Racing Series the Tatuus built Toyota FT50 was introduced. On 20 July 2014 the FT50 was tested by former series champion Nick Cassidy at Adria International Raceway. The car features the same engine as its predecessor but the gearbox was be different. The five speed Sadev gearbox was be upgraded to a six speed gearbox.

Other racing series
For 2006 Tatuus introduced the Tatuus FC106 for the Formula Challenge Japan. The car was used during the entire running of the series between 2006 and 2013.

Another junior formula car designed and manufactured by Tatuus is the Tatuus N.T07.  This car was the sole car for the 2007, 2008 and 2009 International Formula Master seasons.

Italian racing class Formula Abarth introduced the Tatuus FA010 powered by a 1.4L Fiat-FPT engine. The car was later introduced in the Formula Masters China (2011), Panam GP Series (2012), Formula Russia (2013). Starting in 2014 the Florida Winter Series, set up by the Ferrari Driver Academy, will use an updated version of the Tatuus FA010. For 2014 Tatuus was contracted to build all the cars for the Formula 4 Italian Championship, a new class under the rules of the FIA Formula 4. The Tatuus F4-T014 is powered by a detuned Formula Abarth engine, limited to 160hp. In 2015, the new ADAC Formula 4 adopted the Tatuus car. The BRDC Formula 4 Championship announced in September 2014 that it would use a Tatuus chassis from the 2015 BRDC Formula 4 Autumn Trophy.

Group CN
In 2012 Tatuus announced their first Group CN sports car. The car competed in the Italian Prototype Championship, V de V Proto Endurance and the Speed Euro Series, fielded by the revived factory team. Factory driver Davide Rigon drove the car to a second place during the Speed Euro Series round at Imola. Raffaele Giammaria achieved three podium finishes and a fifth place in the Italian Prototype championship. For the 2013 season the Tatuus PY012 was entered by various teams in various racing series. The factory team ran partial schedule in the V de V Proto Endurance. Brandon Maïsano and Sebastián Merchán won the 6 hour race at Magny-Cours.

W Series
The inaugural 2019 season of the all-female W Series championship used Alfa Romeo powered F3-specification T-318s, all operated by Hitech Racing.

Racecars

References

External links

FR2000 Datasheet 

Italian racecar constructors
Companies established in 1980
Italian Formula 3 teams
Sports car manufacturers
Italian auto racing teams
Formula Renault Eurocup teams